Théo Leoni (born 21 April 2000) is a Belgian footballer who plays for Anderlecht as a midfielder in the Belgian First Division A.

Career
Leoni moved from the youth ranks of R. Charleroi S.C. to Anderlecht in 2012.
Leoni made his debut for Anderlecht in the Belgian First Division A on 30 October, 2022 against K.A.S. Eupen. He had been captaining RSCA Futures in the Challenger Pro League, and been training with the Anderlecht first team since being promoted under former manager Vincent Kompany in 2019. A graceful left-footed playmaker, a debut in the first team prior to 2022 had been delayed by an initial lack of physicality but this part of his game developed with time. This development was to the extent that he has been described as “a revelation at number 8, the engine of the RCSA Futures”. Commenting after his debut at the relatively late age of 22, Leoni said he “had always remained positive” during his ten years at the club despite seeing players younger than him make first team starts before him.

References

External links

2000 births
Living people
Belgian footballers
Belgium youth international footballers
Association football midfielders
R.S.C. Anderlecht players
RSCA Futures players
Belgian Pro League players
Challenger Pro League players